Horsehay Quarries is a  geological Site of Special Scientific Interest west of Bicester in Oxfordshire. It is a Geological Conservation Review site.

These quarries expose rocks dating to the Middle Jurassic period. The sequence runs from the Northampton Sand Formation of the Aalenian about 172 million years ago to the Taynton Limestone Formation of the Middle Bathonian around 167 million years ago.

The site is private land with no public access.

References

Sites of Special Scientific Interest in Oxfordshire
Geological Conservation Review sites